Now That's What I Call Music! 14 was released on November 4, 2003. The album is the 14th edition of the (US) Now! series. It peaked at number three on the Billboard 200 and number eleven on the R&B/Hip-Hop albums charts. It has been certified 3× Platinum. The album spent a record 13 weeks in the top 10 of the Billboard 200, the most for any multi-artist compilation album since 1963.

Now! 14 features the Billboard Hot 100 number-one hit, "Crazy in Love".

Track listing

Note: The Lumidee single "Never Leave You (Uh Oooh, Uh Oooh)" is not the remix featuring Fabolous & Busta Rhymes, but the original album version.

Charts

Weekly charts

Year-end charts

References

2003 compilation albums
 014
Sony Music compilation albums